Reichenbach Abbey is a monastery of the Brothers Hospitallers, formerly a Benedictine monastery, in Reichenbach in Bavaria, Germany.

History
The monastery, dedicated to the Assumption of the Blessed Virgin, was founded in 1118 by Markgraf Diepold III of Vohburg and his mother Luitgard. During the Reformation it was looted, and secularised from 1553 to 1669, when it was re-established. It was dissolved again in 1803 during the secularisation of Bavaria. The abbey's property was confiscated by the state and eventually auctioned off in 1820.

After a couple of unsuccessful attempts to restore it as a religious house, the site was acquired in 1890 by the Brothers Hospitallers, who established a nursing home for the mentally and physically handicapped.  Today there is in addition a special school teaching therapeutic care.

Burials
Richeza of Berg

References

External links

 Brothers Hospitallers Reichenbach website
 Reichenbach Community website: history of the monastery
  Klöster in Bayern

Benedictine monasteries in Germany
Monasteries in Bavaria
1110s establishments in the Holy Roman Empire
1118 establishments in Europe
Religious organizations established in the 1110s
Christian monasteries established in the 12th century